Castellbisbal is a municipality in the comarca of Vallès Occidental in Catalonia. It is situated on the left bank of the Llobregat river at its confluence with the Rubí river. The town is served by the A-7 autopista, the main N-II road and the RENFE railway line R4 between Barcelona and València.

The remains of the Castellbisbal castle are visible on a hill near to the actual urban centre, while the surviving portion
of the Pont del Diable ("Devil's Bridge") across the Llobregat river with its triumphal arch illustrates the historical
importance of the town on the Via Augusta. The parish church of Sant Vincenç dates from the sixteenth century,
while a Romanesque chapel (12th century) is in Can Pederol de Baix.

References

 Panareda Clopés, Josep Maria; Rios Calvet, Jaume; Rabella Vives, Josep Maria (1989). Guia de Catalunya, Barcelona: Caixa de Catalunya.  (Catalan).

External links 
 Official website 
 Government data page 

Municipalities in Vallès Occidental
Populated places in Vallès Occidental